A lesbian bar (sometimes called a "women's bar") is a drinking establishment that caters exclusively or predominantly to lesbian women. While often conflated, the lesbian bar has a history distinct from that of the gay bar.

Significance 
Lesbian bars predate feminist spaces such as bookstores and coffeeshops, and contemporary LGBT services such as community centers and health care centers. While few lesbian-specific bars exist today, lesbian bars have long been sites of refuge, validation, community, and resistance for women whose sexual orientations are considered "deviant" or non-normative. They have been spaces for intergenerational community building, where women had the opportunity to come out without being "outed", which can result in the loss of jobs, family, and social status. They could, however, also be sites of intense isolation.

History 
While women in the USA have historically been barred from public spaces promoting alcohol consumption, women's saloon presence rose in the 1920s.  Prohibition's speakeasies allowed women to drink publicly more freely.

Meanwhile, in Weimar Germany, lesbian bars and night clubs were numerous, especially in Berlin. Entrepreneur, Elsa Conrad, ran several venues which catered to a lesbian intellectual elite. Her bar, Mali und Igel hosted guests such as Marlene Dietrich.

San Francisco's Mona's 440 Club, opened in 1936, is widely cited as the first lesbian bar in the United States. In the 1950s, bars began to emerge for working-class lesbians, white and black. Very characteristic of these (often referred to as "Old Gay") bars was binary heterosexist models of coupling and an enforcement of a (white) butch/femme or (black) stud/femme binary. Because of a lack of economic capital and segregation, house parties were popular among black lesbians. Lesbians who changed roles were looked down upon and sometimes referred to as "KiKi" or "AC/DC". Out of this early organizing of lesbians came the homophile movement and the Daughters of Bilitis.

Lesbian and gay identification and bar culture expanded exponentially with the migration and passing through of people in big cities during and after World War II.

In the 1960s, with the rise of the gay liberation movement and an increasing identification with the term and identity "lesbian", women's bars increased in popularity. The 1970s saw the rise of lesbian feminism, and bars became important community activist spaces. Lesbian bars also supported women's softball teams.

Policing and backlash 
Homosexual acts were illegal in the United States until gradual decriminalization from 1962 to 2003, and police raids were a risk at places where lesbianism was considered criminal indecency. Undercover and off-duty police officers have terrorized lesbian bars since their inception. Lesbians could be harassed and detained by the police for publicly gathering in a place where alcohol was being served, dancing with someone of the same gender, or failure to present identification. Some San Francisco bar owners banded together in the Tavern Guild to fight back against this, collecting funds to defend patrons who had been arrested in raids.

Men were often the landlords of lesbian bars, in order to secure liquor licenses and navigate relationships with the police and the Mafia. Bar owners often bribed police to warn them just prior to raids, upon which they would turn on the lights in the bar and lesbians would separate.

As a form of protection, some bars covered their windows, did not have identifying signage, or could only be entered through a back door. Some bar owners tried membership-based models, which heightened security but was also exclusionary.

Decline 
In addition to drinking, lesbian bar culture has also revolved around community building, dancing, and pool playing. This targeted but not lucrative patronage was not always profitable and caused many bars to shut their doors.

These pieces of history are being lost as the "neighborhood lesbian bar" is increasingly unable to make rent payments, and as gentrification contributes to declining patronage. Gay male bars persist as gay men have more economic capital, and the rise of internet dating culture is displacing the cultivation of intergenerational lesbian communities historically created in lesbian bars. Because lesbian women are more likely to be primary caretakers of children than gay men, lesbian neighborhoods take on a different shape than gay neighborhoods, and as a result, lesbian night life decreases.

Along with the increased mainstreaming of LGBTQ culture, use of the term "queer" for self-identification, instead of "lesbian", has grown among many younger members of the lesbian community; and with the rise in internet dating culture, lesbian-specific bars have become less common in modern times.

Some documentaries about the decline include:

 The Death of Lesbian Bars (focus on Australia).
 The Last Lesbian Bars (2015) (focus on the United States).
 Lesbian Bar Project (2022) (focus on the United States).

List of lesbian bars

Lesbian bars have become rare in Western culture nations, and there are signs of decline in parts of Asia as well. However, there are some lesbian-friendly and gay-owned bars today that host "lesbian nights" or "queer women" nights. Some current and past lesbian bars include:

Asia 

Hong Kong
 Virus and L'Paradis are two lesbian bars left in Hong Kong, down from nine in previous years.

Tokyo (Japan)
Goldfinger started as a lesbian bar in the Shinjuku Ni-chōme neighborhood in the early 2000s and is now mixed, but allows only women on Saturdays.

Shanghai (China)
Roxie's, the first lesbian bar in Shanghai, opened in 2014.

Australia and New Zealand

Sydney (Australia)

Various nights occur regularly in Sydney catering to LGBTQ women.

 Unicorns, created by Delsi the Cat, is a semi-regular party, generally with a warehouse vibe. It also occurs at other locations, such as Melbourne.
 GiRLTHING, described as a 'femme-queer' party, is run by Snatch&Grab monthly, generally at the Imperial Hotel. 
 Birdcage was launched in 2012 and generally occurs weekly. It describes itself as, 'Enmore's Queerest Shin-Dig'.

Melbourne (Australia)

 Sundaylicious, a monthly Sunday session event held at various different venues across Melbourne.
 Friyay, a bi-monthly event held on every second and fourth Friday of the month, at Francseca's Bar in Northcote, Melbourne.
 Mother, a regular club night held at Attik.

Canada
Montreal (Quebec)
BabyFace Disco was the first lesbian only bar to open in Montreal in the late 1960s, followed by Chez Madame Arthur and Chez Jilly.
Labyris, Lilith, and L'Exit were popular in the 1980s "Golden Age" of Montreal lesbian bars when a lesbian neighborhood in the Plateau Mont Royal flourished, with bookstores, community organizations and cafes. 
Tabou, Klytz, G-Spot and Magnolia were among a dozen bars for women that opened in the 1990s, though many of them were short-lived.

By 2019, there were no lesbian bars left in Montreal, though events for queer women continued to be held.

Europe

Barcelona (Spain)

 Daniel's, opened in late 1975, was one of the first lesbian bars in Spain and one of the first LGBT bars in Barcelona. Opened by María del Carmen Tobar, it originally was a bar and billiards room but expanded to have a dance hall. In the early years of the Spanish democratic transition, the police would occasionally raid the bar. Tobar played an active role in making Daniel's the center of lesbian life in Barcelona, sponsoring sports teams and a theater group. The bar later closed, but would be remembered in books and exhibits for its importance in the lesbian history of Spain.

Copenhagen (Denmark)

 Vela Gay Club, all-girls bar in Vesterbro district.

Frankfurt (Germany)
 La Gata, the only lesbian bar in Frankfurt, opened in 1971. According to owner Erika "Ricky" Wild, it "is the world's oldest surviving lesbian bar."

London (England)

 Candy Bar in Soho, opened in 1996 and closed in 2014. Men were allowed if gay and accompanied by women.
 The Gateways Club in Chelsea was one of the longest-surviving lesbian bars in the world. It opened in 1943 and closed in 1985. The bar was the setting for a scene in the 1968 film The Killing of Sister George, with real clientele dancing alongside its lead actresses.

Paris (France)

 Chez Moune was a lesbian cabaret that opened in Place Pigalle in 1936. It converted to a mixed music club in the 21st century.
 New Moon was located in Place Pigalle. Similar to Chez Moune, the lesbian cabaret converted to a mixed music club in the 21st century.
 Pulp was a popular Pulp Fiction movie style bar from 1997 to 2007.

Other Parisian lesbian bars include La Mutinerie, Le Bar’Ouf, Le 3W Kafé, Ici Bar de Filles, and So What.

Mexico, Central, and South America

Mexico City (Mexico)

 Babiana Club Less is a lesbian nightclub that opened in the Zona Rosa neighborhood in 2013.

Buenos Aires (Argentina)

 Bach Bar, the oldest gay bar in Buenos Aires, started as a lesbian bar and still draws a lesbian crowd.

Middle East

Beirut (Lebanon)
Coup d'Etat, opened in 2006 during a ceasefire in Lebanon, claimed to be the Middle East's first openly lesbian bar. It did not attract enough business from either local gay women or tourists, and closed in 2007. By 2018, it had opened again.
Istanbul (Turkey) 
Bigudi was the first lesbian bar to open in Istanbul, and now attracts gay men as well.
Tel Aviv (Israel)
Amazonas, open on Thursdays and Saturdays, was the only lesbian bar operating in Tel Aviv in 2019.

South Africa

 Beaulah in Cape Town was originally a lesbian bar until it became mixed.

United States

According to a June 2021 article on PBS NewsHour, there were more than 200 lesbian bars across the United States in the late 1980s and that number has dropped to 21 due to the response to the COVID-19 pandemic, the availability of dating apps, gentrification, and assimilation of queer people.

Asbury Park, New Jersey

 The Bond Street Bar operated in the 1970s and 1980s.
 Chez-Elle (also known as the Chez-L Lounge) was founded in 1965 at 429 Cookman Avenue by former nun Margaret Hogan. The bar "was part of a landmark court case in the 1960s...."
 The Key West Hotel was a lesbian resort with four bars, a restaurant, and pool.  It opened in 1981 and closed in 1990.
 The Owl and Pussycat, established in 1979 at 162 Main Street, was relocated to the Key West Hotel.

In the late 1930s, 208 Bond Street was the location of a women’s bar. In the 1970s, the third floor of the M&K nightclub, a gay disco on Cookman Avenue, was for lesbians.

Atlanta, Georgia

 My Sister's Room, founded in 1996, is the longest running lesbian-centric establishment in the Southeast.
 Phase One was founded in the 2010s and catered primarily to African-American lesbians.

Columbus, Ohio

 Slammers, founded in 1993, is the only remaining Lesbian bar in Ohio.

Dallas, Texas

 Sue Ellen's, founded in 1989,  is the second longest running lesbian bar in the nation.

Houston, Texas

 Chances Bar operated as a predominantly lesbian bar for 16 years until closure in November 2010.
The Pearl Bar became the city's only lesbian bar in 2013.

Milwaukee, Wisconsin

 Walker's Pint, which opened in 2001, is the only surviving lesbian bar in Milwaukee.

New York City, New York

New York city comprises five boroughs: The Bronx, Brooklyn, Manhattan, Queens, and Staten Island.

 Bum Bum Bar in Queens opened in the early 1990s and closed in 2018.
 Cubbyhole in Manhattan opened in 1994 and is a predominantly lesbian bar.
 Eve's Hangout, also known as Eve Adams's Tearoom, was one of the first lesbian restaurant/bars in the United States. It was opened in 1925 by Eva Kotchever and located at 129 MacDougal Street in Greenwich Village. The venue displayed a sign greeting visitors that read: "Men are admitted but not welcome." Eve's Hangout closed in 1926 after Kotchever was arrested and deported for obscenity. Following her deportation she was sent to the concentration camp at Auschwitz where she was killed in 1943.
 Ginger's Bar (aka "The G-Spot") in Brooklyn opened in 2000.
 Henrietta Hudson in Manhattan opened in 1991 and was formerly the longest-running lesbian bar in the New York City area. In 2021 it was rebranded as a "Queer Human Bar."

 Oregon

 Doc Marie's, Portland.

Philadelphia, Pennsylvania

 Sisters was a lesbian bar that closed after 17 years of operation in 2013.
 Toasted Walnut Bar & Kitchen opened its doors in 2015 and closed in 2021. The bar was opened to cater to those who felt a void after the loss of Sisters bar. Although Toasted Walnut focused primarily on gay women, the establishment was not explicitly a lesbian bar.

San Francisco and Bay Area, California

 Amelia's, at 647 Valencia Street in the Mission district, opened in 1978 and closed in 1991.
 Clementina's Baybrick Inn (a.k.a. "The Brick"), at 1190 Folsom Street in SoMa, was a hotel and nightclub for lesbians. It opened in 1982 and closed in 1987.
 The Lexington Club, at 3464 19th Street in the Mission district, opened in 1997 and closed in 2015. It was the last lesbian bar in the city.
 Maud's, at 937 Cole Street in the Haight-Ashbury district, opened in 1966 and closed in 1989.
 Peg's Place, at 4737 Geary Boulevard in the Richmond district, opened in the 1950s and closed in 1988. In March 1979, it was the site of a lesbophobic attack by off-duty members of the S.F.P.D.
 Wild Side West, at 424 Cortland Avenue in Bernal Heights, defines itself as "a blend of lesbians, locals, eclectic art and neighborhood sports bar." It opened in 1962.

Many lesbian bars in the 1940s and 50s were in North Beach and included  Tommy's Place/12 Adler Place,  Anxious Asp, Artist's Club, Beaded Bag, Beige Room, Blanco's, Chi-Chi Club, Copper Lantern, Front, Miss Smith's Tea Room, Tin Angel, Tommy 299, Our Club, and Paper Doll.  The police raid of Kelly's Alamo Club in 1956 and the arrest of 36 women on charges of "frequenting a house of ill repute" led the Daughters of Bilitis to publish a guide, "What To Do In Case of Arrest."

Scott's Pit was active in the 1970s.  A Little More was a 1980s lesbian dance club.

In the East Bay, there was Mary's First in Oakland, and Last Chance Bar was closed in 1958 for "catering to lesbians", but the bar challenged the ruling and won. Bars during the 1970s and 80s included Jubilee, Driftwood, Bachanal, and Ollie's.

Seattle, Washington

  The Grand Union, entered through an unmarked door under an overpass,  and Sappho's Tavern were lesbian bars of the 1950s.
  The Silver Slipper  was a popular lesbian bar of the 1970s, when women's spaces proliferated. .  In an oral history, a former customer spoke of the importance of being personally introduced and wearing the unofficial "jeans and flannel shirt" dress code inside the bar.
 The Wildrose was started in the early 1980s by a lesbian collective, and is the longest running lesbian bar on the West Coast.

Washington, D.C.

 A League of Her Own occupies the basement floor of gay bar Pitchers and is frequented by lesbians, despite resisting the "lesbian bar" label.
 Phase 1 was the oldest (45 years) continually operating lesbian bar in the United States until its closure in February 2016.
 XX+ opened as a lesbian bar in 2018, but closed due to the COVID-19 pandemic.

West Hollywood, California

 The Palms was founded in the 1960s, when the area now known as the City of West Hollywood was a Los Angeles neighborhood. It closed in 2013.

See also 

 Last Call at Maud's (1993 documentary about the last evening at a San Francisco lesbian bar)
 Dyke marches  
 Save Our Children
 White Horse Inn (Oakland, California)
 Lesbian Bar Project
 Types of drinking establishment

References

Further reading

News, magazine, website

 
 
 
 
  (North Carolina, U.S.)
 
 
 
 
 
 
 
 
 
 
 
 
 
 
 
 
 
 

 Academia

 </ref>
 
 

 Books

External links
  Lesbian Nightlife Map  at the Addresses Project
  The Boy Mechanic project (history of lesbian bars in the United States and Europe)
  Eulogy for the Dyke Bar by Macon Reed

Bars (establishments)
Lesbian culture
Lesbian history
LGBT drinking establishments
 
Types of drinking establishment